Yannick Anzuluni (born August 21, 1988) is a Canadian professional basketballer, who played for Rostock Seawolves of the German ProA league. Previously, when he played with Tampereen Pyrintö  team in the Finnish First Division, he was an All-Star, led the league in scoring and steals, and was named Player of the Year. Anzuluni also had a history playing in the NBL Canada, with the Quebec Kebs. He was named a NBL Canada All-Star in 2012, but did not appear in the game.

References

External links 
 FIBA.com profile
 USBasket profile
 Yannick Anzuluni at RealGM

1988 births
Living people
Basketball players from Kinshasa
Basketball players from Ottawa
Democratic Republic of the Congo emigrants to Canada
Canadian sportspeople of African descent
Sportspeople of Democratic Republic of the Congo descent
Houghton University alumni
Laval Kebs players
Phoenix Hagen players
Rostock Seawolves players
Small forwards
Tampereen Pyrintö players
Franco-Ontarian people
Canadian expatriate basketball people in Germany
Canadian expatriate basketball people in Finland
Canadian expatriate basketball people in Sweden
Djurgårdens IF Basket players